Burning Japan Live 1999 is a live album by the Swedish melodic death metal band Arch Enemy. Originally released in Japan only, the album was re-released worldwide in 2000 due to fan demand.

Reception
Burning Japan Live 1999 received mixed reviews by critics. Metal Rules's El Cid criticized mainly the crowd writing that "the Japanese crowd doesn't help much in this matter, no offense to anyone but it does seem like everyone is just sitting down listening and doing nothing else during a gig unless they are instructed to by Johan Liiva" and stated that the album "is very much like listening to a compilation of Arch Enemy songs rather than a live album." On the other hand, Paul Schwarz of Chronicles of Chaos wrote in his review that it "has a clear yet characteristic sound which places it in the rare category of being a live album well worth owning. The musical elements have a live-sounding rawness while retaining the subtleties which are such essential parts of Arch Enemy's masterful mixture of pure riff and metal melodies". He praised Liiva writing that his "vocal delivery is both powerful and expressive - and similarly well-balanced and accentuated by the top-notch production." Schwarz finished writing about the crowd, "the crowd are enthusiastically loud though their fanatical support is thankfully quite unintrusive to the enjoyment of the record."

Track listing

Personnel
Personnel credits adapted from Burning Bridges album liner notes.

Arch Enemy
 Johan Liiva − vocals
 Michael Amott − lead guitar, producer
 Christopher Amott − rhythm guitar
 Sharlee D'Angelo − bass
 Daniel Erlandsson − drums

Production
 Fredrik Nordström − producer, mixing
 Steve Gurney − engineer, recording
 Göran Finnberg – mastering

References

External links
 Burning Japan Live 1999 at Encyclopaedia Metallum
 Burning Japan Live 1999 at Discogs

Arch Enemy albums
2000 live albums
Albums produced by Fredrik Nordström
Century Media Records live albums